2012–13 Pirveli Liga  was the 24th season of the Georgian Pirveli Liga. It began on 25 August 2012 and finished on 27 May 2013.

Format 

24 teams were divided into groups A and B to take part in a three-round competition. Group leaders gained promotion to the top tier, while bottom two clubs were relegated to the third division.

Teams

Group A

Group B

League tables

A Group

B Group 

Following this success Guria returned to Umaglesi Liga after an eleven-year pause. Tskhinvali achieved the same goal from the first attempt.

References

External links
 Results, fixtures, tables at Soccerway

See also 
 2012–13 Umaglesi Liga
 2012–13 Georgian Cup

Erovnuli Liga 2 seasons
2012–13 in Georgian football
Georgia